Qasem Qeshlaqi or Qasem Qeshlaq may refer to:
Qasem Qeshlaqi, Ardabil, village in Ardabil County, Ardabil Province, Iran
Qasem Qeshlaqi, Bileh Savar, village in Bileh Savar County, Ardabil Province, Iran
Qasem Qeshlaqi, Nir, village in Nir County, Ardabil Province, Iran